Middendorp is a hamlet in the Netherlands and is part of the Emmen municipality in Drenthe.

Middendorp has a statistical entry with Oosterse Bos, however the postal authorities have placed it under Schoonebeek. It was first mentioned in the 1850s as 't Middendorp. The name means "village in the middle".

References 

Populated places in Drenthe
Emmen, Netherlands